Pseudochama gryphina is a species of bivalve mollusc in the family Chamidae. This species can be found in the Mediterranean Sea and on coasts of Angola and surroundings.

Fossil records
The genus Pseudochama is known from the Eocene to the Recent periods (age range: from 40.4 to 0.0 million years ago).

References

Chamidae
Bivalves described in 1819
Taxa named by Jean-Baptiste Lamarck
Molluscs of the Mediterranean Sea